Holland station is a defunct railroad station in Holland, Pennsylvania. Located on Holland Road, it served the Reading Railroad and later SEPTA Regional Rail's Fox Chase/Newtown Line. SEPTA cancelled railroad service in 1983; buses continued to stop at the station in 1999, and the facility was subsequently demolished.

History
Holland station was a stop on the Reading Railroad's Newtown Line. It later became a part of SEPTA's Fox Chase Rapid Transit Line. The station, and all of those north of Fox Chase station, was closed on January 18, 1983 due to failing diesel train equipment.

In addition, a labor dispute began within the SEPTA organization when the transit operator inherited 1,700 displaced employees from Conrail. SEPTA insisted on utilizing transit operators from the Broad Street Subway to operate Fox Chase-Newtown diesel trains, while Conrail requested that railroad engineers run the service. When a federal court ruled that SEPTA had to use Conrail employees in order to offer job assurance, SEPTA cancelled Fox Chase-Newtown trains. Service in the diesel-only territory north of Fox Chase was cancelled at that time, and Holland station still appears in publicly posted tariffs.

Although rail service was initially replaced with a Fox Chase-Newtown shuttle bus, patronage remained light, and the Fox Chase-Newtown shuttle bus service ended in 1999. SEPTA constructed a metal shelter in the early 1980s shortly before train service ended. The shelter was demolished in the summer of 2000, shortly after bus service was terminated.

References

External links
Newtown Line.pa-tec.org – PA-TEC study on resuming SEPTA commuter service between Fox Chase and Newtown

Former SEPTA Regional Rail stations
Former Reading Company stations
Railway stations closed in 1983
Former railway stations in Bucks County, Pennsylvania